Rilhac-Lastours (Limousin: Rilhac de Las Tors) is a commune in the Haute-Vienne department in the Nouvelle-Aquitaine region in west-central France.

See also
Gouffier of Lastours
Château de Lastours
Communes of the Haute-Vienne department

References

Communes of Haute-Vienne